Six Flags Magic Mountain, formerly known and colloquially referred to as simply Magic Mountain, is a  amusement park located in Valencia, California,  northwest of downtown Los Angeles. It opened on May 29, 1971, as a development of the Newhall Land and Farming Company and Sea World Inc. In 1979, Six Flags purchased the park and added "Six Flags" to the park's name.

With 20 roller coasters, Six Flags Magic Mountain holds the world record for most roller coasters in an amusement park. It became the first amusement park to offer 20 roller coasters with the opening of Wonder Woman: Flight of Courage in 2022. In 2019, the park had an estimated 3.61 million visitors, ranking it fifteenth in attendance in North America.

History

In 1968, Sea World Inc. founder George Millay and his executives began looking for a place in the Los Angeles county to build a theme park. Knowing that Newhall Land and Farming Company had enough undeveloped land in the new town of Valencia, he asked CEO John F. Dickason if they could build a theme park. They eventually formed a partnership to build a 200-acre theme park. Construction began in November 1969, until May 1971.

When the park opened, there were 500 employees and 33 attractions, many of which were designed and built by Arrow Development that did previous work on attractions at Disneyland. The admission price in 1971 was $5 for adults, and $3.50 for children between the ages of 3 and 12. Because the park was in a relatively remote part of Los Angeles County, the Greyhound bus line provided bus service to and from the park and Los Angeles, as well as from Northern California, and optionally allowed purchase of park admission at the time the bus ticket was purchased.

At its 1971 opening, the rides and attractions included Gold Rusher, a steel coaster; the Log Jammer, a log flume; the Sky Tower, an observation tower; Grand Prix, similar to Disneyland's Autopia ride; El Bumpo, bumper boats; a Carousel; and other smaller rides. There were four transportation rides to the peak: Funicular, a cable railway or funicular, later renamed Orient Express; the Metro, which consisted of three monorail stations around the park: Whitewater Lake, Country Fair, and Mountain stations; and "Eagles Flight", a skyride that combined two stations at the peak: the long one north to Galaxy Station, and the short one west to El Dorado Station.  The Showcase Theater (renamed Golden Bear Theater), was part of the original park and featured Barbra Streisand as the first of many headline performers who would appear at Magic Mountain over the years.

In the 1971 season, Magic Mountain obtained permission from Warner Bros. to use Looney Tunes/Merrie Melodies characters. However, they did not continue using the characters after their first year (another Six Flags park Great America has continuously used such characters since its opening in 1976, eight years before Marriott Corporation sold the park to Six Flags.) In 1972, they began using trolls as the park mascots. The trolls King Blop, also known as King Troll, Bleep, Bloop, and the Wizard became recognizable symbols of Magic Mountain. All King Productions, a contractor, provided the entertainers wearing the costumes until December 31, 1972, when Magic Mountain took on that role. The characters were used until 1985. Also in 1972, a second flume ride named Jet Stream was added.

In 1973, the park added its second roller coaster, the Mountain Express, a compact Schwarzkopf Wildcat model steel coaster.  In 1974, the park also installed a new complex of spinning rides in what would later be known as Back Street. The new additions consisted of the Himalaya, Electric Rainbow, and Tumble Drum. In 1975, the Grand Centennial Railway opened in the Back Street. It took riders on a train journey to Spillikin Corners and back.

The Coaster Revolution

With the opening of Great American Revolution in 1976, Magic Mountain became the first park in the world to have a modern, 360-degree steel looping coaster (though previous roller coasters with loops had been built and dismantled elsewhere due to safety issues). When it was built, there was very little in the way of surrounding brush. Now, the tracks are surrounded by trees and bushes, which prevents the riders from knowing the track layout beforehand. Universal then filmed a major movie at Magic Mountain with the Revolution as its centerpiece called Rollercoaster in 1977. 

In 1978, Colossus, at the time the fastest, largest dual-tracked wooden coaster, opened. Following its first season, it was closed and extensively redone. When it reopened, it was a much smoother ride. In 1991, the camel hump before the last, or third, turn was replaced by a block brake. Though it decreased the speed of the ride after this particular brake, it did allow three trains to run per side at a time, greatly increasing capacity. One of the trains sometimes ran backwards for a few years in the mid-80s. However, until the late 1990s this kind of ride was no longer possible due to the newer ride system in place, as well as different trains. During Fright Fest, the park runs one side backwards using a set of trains acquired from the now demolished Psyclone which was located on the other side of the park. In 2015, the coaster was re-tracked with steel tracking and several inversions were added to the coaster. It was subsequently rebranded "Twisted Colossus". This renovation was completed by Rocky Mountain Construction.

Six Flags era

In 1979, the park was sold to Six Flags and became known as Six Flags Magic Mountain. In 1981, Six Flags Magic Mountain introduced a ride that was on the west coast for the first time called Roaring Rapids. It was developed by Intamin in conjunction with the now defunct Six Flags Astroworld, which had opened a similar ride in 1979. Along with Rapids came the completion of the midway near Spillikin Corners to link with Revolution's area. Finally, a complete circuit could be made around the park. It was originally designed as a dual-sided station, but only one was fully developed, and all that exists of the possible second side is a few supports. It uses large pumps to circulate water, and each of the two pumps can circulate 88,500 gallons per minute. The reservoir can hold 1.5 million gallons of water, and one of the innovations used on it was the introduction of guide boards to help eliminate jam ups.

In 1982, the attraction Freefall was added. Also built by Intamin, it was considered a cutting edge drop tower ride, if not strictly a "roller coaster." It simply ascends the tower and then drops down, with the track curving to horizontal, leaving riders on their backs. Others were built for other parks (some of which are Six Flags). Today, most of these rides are obsolete and have been removed. Some flat rides were added and others removed the next year.

In 1984, Sarajevo Bobsleds was erected. Yet another ride built by Intamin, the coaster was basically a bobsled without ice and snow. The coaster was built in honor of the 1984 Olympics. Six Flags Great Adventure added a similar ride that same year. In 1986, Sarajevo Bobsleds was removed and now operates at Six Flags Over Texas as La Vibora. The other bobsled was moved to Six Flags Great America and later to The Great Escape in Queensbury, New York, where it operates as Alpine Bobsled.

In 1985, Children's World was rethemed as Bugs Bunny World, as Magic Mountain had abandoned the Trolls in favor of Warner Bros.' Looney Tunes/Merrie Melodies characters. That year, Michael Jackson visited the park, riding rides such as Colossus, Revolution and Roaring Rapids. In 1986, the park added a steel stand-up looping roller coaster called Shockwave also designed by Intamin. This coaster was located in the back of the park replacing Sarajevo Bobsleds. At the end of 1988, the coaster was removed as part of a ride rotation program and went to Six Flags Great Adventure in 1990. It was removed from there in 1992 and was repainted white and rethemed upon its removal to Six Flags Astroworld. There it was known as Batman The Escape. When Astroworld closed in 2005, the ride would be in storage at Darien Lake, where it remained until 2018 when it was finally sold for scrap.

In 1987, the park re-themed the Back Street. Spinning flat rides were renamed Turbo (Electric Rainbow), Subway (Himalaya), and Reactor (Enterprise). The dance club was rethemed as well, and located near Reactor. After Hours, as it was now called (formerly Decibels), for one summer stayed open later than the rest of the park. It, along with Back Street, would stay open an additional two hours as a place for locals to hang out. This format lasted one season.

In 1988, Ninja, "The Black Belt of Roller Coasters", opened. Built by Arrow Dynamics, it was the first suspended swing roller coaster on the West coast. Ninja has gone through very few changes since it was opened in 1988; evidently only the wheels and paint have been changed.

Tidal Wave opened in 1989. It is a short, wet ride featuring a large boat that travels up a low-angled incline to a level water trough. The trough, in the shape of a semicircle, ends in a steep drop into a large splashpool. The impact displaces large amounts of water on its riders. The ride's exit ramp crosses over the splashpool, allowing willing patrons leaving the ride to get soaked from the splash.

In 1990, Viper, a multiple looping coaster designed by Arrow Dynamics, opened.

In 1991, Magic Mountain added Psyclone, modeled after the Coney Island Cyclone. The Spillikin Corners area of the park was re-themed as Cyclone Bay to suit the new coaster, drawing guests into this area. The change was largely cosmetic, as the earlier theme relied on retail establishments that had been removed previously. The Glass Blower had been replaced by the Shooting Gallery, and the Candy Kitchen viewing area was redesigned. With Psyclone, the crowds returned. Due to the 1994 Northridge earthquake, Psyclone's structure was damaged, and the ride was eventually removed in 2007. After adding Ninja, Viper, and Psyclone within 4 years, the park was getting a large repertoire of big roller coasters.

The next year, 1992, a coaster built by Intamin called Flashback was added. This one-of-a-kind ride, originally planned to be enclosed in a building, had already operated at Six Flags Great America and Six Flags Over Georgia prior to its arrival. Very steep, short drops were designed to make riders feel like they were "diving" down in a plane, and it ended in a 540 degree upward spiral. But, because of the shoulder harnesses, riders were subjected to a lot of head banging. This coaster rarely ran by 1996 (it created too much noise for the nearby water park) and on January 23, 2007, the park announced that Flashback would be removed along with Psyclone. The park also stated that Flashback might be re-built elsewhere within the park for 2008 but the ride was finally scrapped at the end of 2007.

Time Warner era
In 1993, Six Flags Magic Mountain entered the Time Warner era. The new ride for the year was Yosemite Sam Sierra Falls. It was a water ride that has two twisting tubes that riders could slide down in using a raft. Also that year, there was re-theming and High Sierra Territory was opened. The Showcase Theatre became Golden Bear Theater, the Animal Star Theatre was created in Bugs Bunny World, and a large, fake, wooden tree was built. This year also saw the end of live non-Christian themed concerts in the park due to the riot that broke out as a result of a "TLC" concert that was oversold. Magic Mountain was quickly overwhelmed by large crowds that vandalized and destroyed property.  Park shops had their windows broken and looting quickly followed. Police were called to the scene in full riot gear. The park was evacuated and closed down for the night.

In 1994, Magic Mountain added what two other Six Flags parks already had, a Bolliger & Mabillard inverted looping roller coaster called Batman: The Ride (which other Six Flags parks also added in the coming years). Batman: The Ride (BTR) is an inverted coaster, meaning the usual coaster protocol is reversed; the track is overhead and the cars are below it. The trains travel on the outside of the loops, and rider's legs hang freely, as on a ski lift.

A separately gated waterpark called Six Flags Hurricane Harbor opened on June 16, 1995. The 22-acre park included body slides, tube slides, a kiddie water play area, lazy river, and a wave pool. The following year, a SkyCoaster called Dive Devil opened at Magic Mountain.

A dual launch coaster called Superman: The Escape debuted at the park on March 15, 1997. It was the first roller coaster in the world to reach speeds of 100 mph. Originally slated to open in June 1996, the ride's opening was delayed and pushed back to 1997 as problems with the LSM launch motors were found. The tower structure was painted a grayish white when the ride first opened and lasted until 2011.

In 1998, a new Bolliger & Mabillard Stand-up roller coaster called Riddler's Revenge opened as the tallest and fastest stand-up roller coaster in the world.

Premier Parks era
Also in 1998, Six Flags was sold to Premier Parks. The next year saw no dramatic changes. In 2000, a steel hypercoaster, Goliath, was added. It was built by Giovanola.

2001 was to be the year of three new roller coasters, but only one actually opened on time: Goliath Jr., a steel kiddie coaster. The other two, Déjà Vu and X (now X²), had mechanical problems. Déjà Vu opened late in 2001 and X opened early in 2002. Déjà Vu was designed by Vekoma and is a Giant Inverted Boomerang coaster (GIB), a variant of their popular Boomerang design. It is an inverted coaster with coaches suspended beneath an overhead track that traverses an open-circuit track forward and in reverse and features two completely vertical drops and three inversions. It opened late in 2001, but suffered a lot of downtime. X was designed by Arrow Dynamics, as the world's first "fourth-dimensional" roller coaster. It was the only one in North America where riders experience going 360 degrees in their seats. Each seat lies on a separate axis from the track. This coaster managed to open briefly on January 12, 2002, only to close due to more technical problems. It reopened late in August of that year. The ride closed for a major refurbishment and re-theme in 2008 where X transformed into X².

In 2003, Scream, designed by Bolliger & Mabillard was added. At this point, Six Flags Magic Mountain tied with Cedar Point for the park with the most roller coasters in the United States. Scream is similar in concept with Medusa at Six Flags Discovery Kingdom and is a mirror image of Medusa at Six Flags Great Adventure. In 2006, Tatsu, a Bolliger & Mabillard flying roller coaster was added, causing a temporary closure of Revolution and Roaring Rapids to allow construction to take place. It was much larger than the other three Bolliger & Mabillard Flying Coasters at other Six Flags parks, all named Superman: Ultimate Flight. Tatsu has a suspended-track orientation featuring vehicles that recline passengers with their backs against the track and facing the ground. This brought the park up to 17 roller coasters, to tie with Cedar Point for the greatest number of roller coasters in a park (albeit Flashback had been standing but not operating for an extended period of time and thus it is debatable whether the park could claim 17 as its number of roller coasters).

2006 attempted sale
On June 22, 2006, Six Flags, Inc. announced that it was exploring options for six of its parks, including Magic Mountain and its neighboring water park, Hurricane Harbor. Though management said closing the park was unlikely, rumors still began that the park could be sold to real estate developers, with an intent to close the park and build housing developments in the area. Park officials cited dwindling attendance due to rowdy behavior among some of the park-goers as reasons for wanting to sell the park while management was wanting to move Six Flags into more of a family park direction. Throughout the Six Flags chain, attendance in the second quarter of 2006 was 14 percent lower than it was in the second quarter of 2005.

By the fall of 2006, Six Flags announced that Magic Mountain was still up for sale. They also stated, however, that it would be sold to a company that would continue to operate it as a park, and that closing Magic Mountain was not a possibility. Cedar Fair, Anheuser-Busch, and several others considered buying the park but none of the offers came close to the asking price.

When Six Flags announced which parks it was selling in January 2007, Magic Mountain was no longer one of them. The company decided not to sell Magic Mountain and its adjacent water park. Spokeswoman Wendy Goldberg said that upon further evaluation, the company decided that the Los Angeles parks remained too valuable to relinquish, as sales were increasing, and that the park would not be sold. Other parks were sold as a package and remained open.

Since 2007

Roller coasters Flashback and Psyclone were both removed in 2007, with Psyclone being demolished in February and Flashback remained standing until December of that year, when it was finally scrapped. As a result, Six Flags Magic Mountain no longer tied the record for the most roller coasters in a single park, relinquishing the record to Cedar Point – the park's total had never surpassed Cedar Point but had tied numerous times. The park began focusing more attention on marketing with family-oriented values, and a new children's theme area, Thomas Town, was added in 2008. The park renovated one its thrill rides, however. "X" was closed on December 2 for its transformation into X2 which featured new fourth-generation trains, a new paint job, and special effects that included pyrotechnics and audio. It reopened on May 24, 2008. In the same year, the park began work on the "Magic of the Mountain" museum at the top of its Sky Tower attraction that contained memorabilia throughout the park's history including old television commercials, park maps, models, and equipment saved from defunct rides.

Terminator Salvation: The Ride, a wooden roller coaster, opened on May 23, 2009. It was built in the former location of Psyclone and featured tunnels, spraying mist, and special effects. On January 9, 2011, the ride was renamed to Apocalypse and given an appropriate theme that reflects an "end of the world" scenario. Later that year, Six Flags President and CEO Mark Shapiro said in a Los Angeles Times published interview that Magic Mountain had plans to install a new roller coaster for its 2010 season, and would add a new themed area for children in 2011 called Wiggles World. Shapiro also stated that the adjacent Hurricane Harbor would receive an expansion.

On May 29, 2010, Mr. Six's Dance Coaster was scheduled to open but it was delayed until 2011 when it would open under a new theme. On the same day, Mr. Six's Splash Island opened at the adjacent Hurricane Harbor water park.

On August 3, 2010, it was announced that Superman: The Escape would undergo a major redevelopment before the 2011 season. On October 20, 2010, Six Flags Magic Mountain officially announced their full plans for 2011 after a video was leaked six days earlier. In addition to opening Mr. Six's Dance Coaster under a new name and theme, Six Flags announced two other attractions. In time for the 2011 season, Superman: The Escape was refurbished to Superman: Escape from Krypton and opened on March 19, 2011. The coaster featured new backwards launching cars and a new color scheme. The third and final announcement regards an entirely new thrill roller coaster. The Green Lantern: First Flight opened on July 1, 2011 as Magic Mountain's eighteenth roller coaster which was an Intamin ZacSpin. This roller coaster reclaimed the world record for the highest number of roller coasters at a single theme park. It was later announced, on November 4, 2010, that the children's roller coaster would be called Road Runner Express and located in Bugs Bunny World.

In late 2010, Six Flags began the process of removing non-Warner Bros. licensed theming from attractions. They terminated several licenses including Terminator and Thomas the Tank Engine. Terminator Salvation: The Ride was renamed and rethemed into Apocalypse which re-opened on January 8, 2011. Thomas Town was renamed and rethemed to Whistlestop Park in time for the 2011 season.

On January 18, 2011, the Los Angeles Times reported after considering a new theme based on DC Comics superhero sidekicks, the park opted for simplicity and renamed the Little Flash coaster to Road Runner Express. Due to Green Lantern being placed in Gotham City Backlot, the area was re-themed into DC Universe. In addition, Grinder Gearworks became "Wonder Woman: Lasso Of Truth" and Atom Smasher was renamed "The Flash: Speed Force".

In August 2011, several media sources reported that Six Flags New England would install Six Flags Magic Mountain's Déjà Vu for the park's 2012 season.

On September 1, 2011, Six Flags Magic Mountain announced that they would be opening a new attraction for the 2012 season named Lex Luthor: Drop of Doom. The following day, Six Flags Magic Mountain confirmed on Facebook that Déjà Vu would be removed from the park. Then on September 13, 2011, the park announced that Déjà Vu would be removed after October 16, 2011, "Déjà Vu fans, we have created some exclusive after hours ride time for you to ride it again before October 16."

On October 31, 2011, Log Jammer operated for the last time and was removed to make way for Full Throttle, which opened in 2013.

In August 2012, Six Flags Magic Mountain confirmed rumors that a new roller coaster, Full Throttle, would open the following season. Full Throttle opened as the park's 18th roller coaster, allowing Six Flags Magic Mountain to market having the most roller coasters in the world once again. In addition, Full Throttle set a record for being the first roller coaster to feature a track section with rails on both sides of the spine. This occurs at the top of the ride's massive inversion.

On August 29, 2013, Six Flags Magic Mountain officially announced that they would run both Batman: The Ride and Colossus backwards for a limited time of the 2014 season. They will also expand Bugs Bunny World with the addition of a new roller coaster. On April 8, 2014, Six Flags Magic Mountain announced that the park will host its first ever Holiday in the Park Christmas event in late 2014 and for future years after.

In the summer of 2014, the park placed banners across the property advertising the Bonzai Pipelines in the adjacent property, Hurricane Harbor, along with the closing of Colossus which took place on August 16, 2014.  On August 28, 2014, Six Flags announced the Rocky Mountain Construction conversion of Colossus into Twisted Colossus. Twisted Colossus opened on May 23, 2015.

On September 3, 2015, Six Flags announced the renovation of Revolution with a new paint scheme, upgraded lighting, and new train eliminating the controversial over-the-shoulder restraints that had been the source of the ride's spotty reputation for much of its life. Named "The New Revolution," the roller coaster reopened on April 21, 2016.

On September 1, 2016, the park announced Justice League: Battle for Metropolis to open in 2017. The 4D shooting dark ride is nearly identical to the six other installations located at Six Flags parks around North America. The ride opened on July 12, 2017 and is located in the Metropolis section near The Riddler's Revenge.

On August 29, 2017, Six Flags announced the addition of a Zamperla Giga Discovery flat ride to be built in a newly renovated Boardwalk Beach area near DC Universe. Marketed as "the world's tallest pendulum ride", CraZanity takes riders to a height of 172 feet (52.4 m) and speeds up to 75 mph (120.7 kmh).

On August 29, 2018, the park announced the brand new racing launch coaster West Coast Racers from Premier Rides and a revamp of the old Cyclone Bay area into a high-energy, urban Los Angeles. The ride itself is dubbed the first launched racing coaster in the world and the first quadruple launched coaster, even though the existing Fiorano GT Challenge holds these records. The Möbius loop coaster officially opened to the public on January 9, 2020, and became the 19th coaster at the park.

On March 24, 2019, the park announced that Green Lantern: First Flight would permanently close and be removed from the park which no longer makes West Coast Racers the park's 20th coaster.

On March 13, 2020, the park closed due to the COVID-19 pandemic. The theme park reopened on April 1, 2021, with Members and Passholders being granted access on April 1 and 2, with the general public being admitted to the park on April 3. As of August 2021, Six Flags Magic Mountain visitors are no longer required to wear masks outdoors.

On October 21, 2021, the park announced Wonder Woman Flight of Courage, the world's tallest and fastest single rail coaster, to open in summer 2022. The ride is an I-Box Raptor coaster built by Rocky Mountain Construction.

Starting November 1, 2022, Six Flags Magic Mountain reduced their 365-day operating schedule to operate on select days only. The 365 day schedule, which was introduced in 2018 to “maximize travel industry opportunities,” was limited to select weekends only. Park Marketing & Communications Publicist Alexandria French said in a statement that the changed operation schedule would deliver a more “exceptional guest experience.”

Themed areas
There are presently eleven separately themed areas within the park – each zone featuring its own distinct rides, attractions, and food service venues.

Cinema, television, and computer games

Magic Mountain's proximity to downtown Los Angeles, the hub of the American film and television industry, has resulted in its appearance in several productions, usually representing a park other than itself. The debut of Revolution was the focal point of the 1977 release Rollercoaster. Bob Einstein, as his character Super Dave Osborne, performed his first "stunt" on a roller coaster at Magic Mountain. In 1983, Magic Mountain became the fictional "Walley World" for National Lampoon's Vacation, with scenes featuring Revolution and Colossus (each using fictional names). On television, Magic Mountain doubled as the theme park in the opening credits of the television series Step by Step. Other TV productions featuring Magic Mountain have included: NCIS, Entourage,  The Bionic Woman, The A-Team, CHiPs, Wonder Woman, Way Out Games, Knight Rider, Beverly Hills, 90210, Melrose Place, The King of Queens, and Buffy the Vampire Slayer. The band Kiss also filmed their acting debut in 1978's made-for-TV Kiss Meets the Phantom of the Park that featured the band members in the park and near Colossus.  In the 2000 movie Space Cowboys Donald Sutherland is shown riding Viper and is portrayed as the designer when Clint Eastwood recruits him.

Magic Mountain's Showcase Theatre was the filming location for the video game-themed game show The Video Game from September 1984 to September 1985.

Magic Mountain was also the filming location for the children's educational video series Real Wheels episode "Here Comes A Roller Coaster", with host Dave Hood, which was released in 1995.

Magic Mountain was used as a filming site for the 1990 Kidsongs video, "Ride the Roller Coaster".

Colossus was filmed as the Serpent in the movie in the My Life (film) back in 1993.

Colossus was used for filming for the 1995 Muppets video, Muppets on Wheels.
In the Nickelodeon show Drake & Josh, Drake, Josh, and Megan take a trip to Mystic Mountain (parody of Magic Mountain) in the episode "The Demonator", and they ride the "Demonator". On Zoey 101 Zoey and Lisa take Michael to Mystic Mountain (both series were created by Dan Schneider), and they help Michael overcome his roller coaster fear in the episode "Rollercoaster". He rides the "Spine Twister", which was actually the Goliath from Magic Mountain. In 1990, Nickelodeon's Wild and Crazy Kids, the wooden roller coaster, Colossus, was featured as a game called "Wacky RollerCoaster Spill". The actual filming location is Magic Mountain's amphitheater. The Kidsongs video Ride the Roller Coaster is set at Six Flags Magic Mountain. Nick Cannon group The School Gyrls movie premiere was at Magic Mountain. In the film Judy Moody and the Not Bummer Summer, they go to a theme park and ride a roller coaster for the first time. The coaster was Goliath. Goliath was also featured as the "Aquaman" roller coaster in the third season of the HBO series Entourage.

In 2011, the park was chosen as the setting for the Travel Channel's version of the quiz show Scream! If You Know the Answer. The Glee cast visited the park in 2012 for their senior skip day in the "Big Brother" episode, where they ride Viper.

In 2013, a large section of the parking lot was blocked off for a Toyota Camry commercial. Both pictures and the background footage reveal Goliath and Colossus, indicating that it is Magic Mountain where the commercial was shot. The ride that was built for the commercial bears a resemblance to the park's new coaster at the time, Full Throttle: a big hill, a barrier-test loop, a backwards propulsion section, and a forwards propulsion section that runs through a tunnel placed next to the hill.

In 2016, Goliath was used for a Carpool Karaoke segment with Selena Gomez.

In 2017, the park and Full Throttle were used in the filming of the music video for Katy Perry's "Chained to the Rhythm".

In 2017, areas of the park were used in the filming of the Netflix comedy Sandy Wexler starring Adam Sandler.

In 2021, some areas of the park were used in the filming of the Netflix comedy Yes Day.

Although not featured, Magic Mountain is mentioned numerous times in the Netflix horror-comedy  Santa Clarita Diet.

A recreation of Magic Mountain was featured built in the computer game RollerCoaster Tycoon 2, including a blank version of the park with no rides and attractions.

Attractions

Roller coasters
Six Flags Magic Mountain holds the record for most roller coasters in an amusement park at 20.

Other attractions

Former rides & attractions

Roller coasters

Other rides and attractions

Rankings

Six Flags Magic Mountain's coasters are commonly ranked high in Amusement Today's annual Golden Ticket Awards. With the opening of Full Throttle on June 22, 2013, Six Flags Magic Mountain obtained the world record for the largest number of roller coasters in an amusement park.

Below is a table with roller coasters at Six Flags Magic Mountain and their highest ranking in the Golden Ticket Awards.

Record breaking rides
Six Flags Magic Mountain has several attractions that set world records in various categories.

Attendance 
Although Six Flags does not release attendance figures, the Themed Entertainment Association (TEA) and other theme park industry analyst companies estimate attendance numbers for the park.

See also

 Incidents at Six Flags parks

References
Notes

References

External links

 
 

 
Amusement parks in California
Santa Clarita, California
Magic Mountain
1971 establishments in California
Amusement parks opened in 1971